Angel of his Dreams is an Australian film directed by George Marlow about a woman who seduces a clergyman.

It was Marlow's follow up to Driving a Girl to Destruction.

The play had been performed by Marlow.

Filming took place in December 1911.

References

External links
 

Australian black-and-white films
1912 films
Australian silent feature films